TRNA splicing endonuclease subunit 54 is a protein that in humans is encoded by the TSEN54 gene.

Function
This gene encodes a subunit of the tRNA splicing endonuclease complex, which catalyzes the removal of introns from precursor tRNAs. The complex is also implicated in pre-mRNA 3-prime end processing.

Clinical significance

Mutations in this gene result in pontocerebellar hypoplasia type 2. Sepahvand et al. declared that due to the greatly overlapped phenotypes with well‐described types of PCH, e.g. PCH2, PCH4, and PCH5, "TSENopathies" term should be used which encompasses all described phenotypes of PCHs. They also reported an infratentorial chronic subdural hematoma was detected next to the Galen vein that had been developed in the line of anterior flax, supra‐ and infratentorial atrophy, hypoplasia of the pons, cerebellum and corpus callosum, delayed cerebral myelination and gray and white matter volume loss, absent folding of the olivary nucleus, and loss of transverse fibers of the pons. An extra-axial CSF space was also evident due to brain atrophy. Two novel phenotype was also reported by Sepahvand et al. as structural heart diseases including a large patent foramen ovale (>23 microbubbles), patent ductus arteriosus, and mild tricuspid and mitral valve regurgitations, and a bilaterally moderate sensorineural hearing loss.

References

Further reading

Human proteins